Matthews Sello Moloko (born 6 July 1965) is a South African businessman, banker and corporate executive, who serves as group chairman of Absa Group, a large pan-African financial services group, with subsidiaries in Botswana, Ghana, Kenya, Mauritius, Mozambique, Seychelles, South Africa, Tanzania, Uganda and Zambia. He concurrently serves as the chairman and non-executive director of Absa Bank Limited, the South African subsidiary and the largest of the subsidiary banks of the Absa Group. He began his tenure at Absa on 1 April 2022. He is also the chairman of Telkom, the South African telecommunications  conglomerate, since March 2019.

Background
Sello was born 6 July 1965 in Soweto, South Africa. He holds a Bachelor of Science degree in Mathematics and a  Postgraduate Certificate in Education, both obtained from the University of Leicester in the United Kingdom. He also successfully attended an Advanced Management Program, at the Wharton School of the University of Pennsylvania, in the United States.

Career
Sello was appointed as a non-executive director of the Absa Group in October 2021, with his appointment effective 1 December 2021. At the same time, he was appointed as chairman-designate of both Absa Group Limited and Absa Bank Limited, effective 1 April 2022. He replaced Wendy Lucas-Bull, who retired as the bank group's chairperson after nine consecutive years in that position.

Previous leadership positions in business include as co-founder and Executive Chairman of Thesele Group, an all-Black diversified investment company. His business experience spans over 30 years. He has served in the past as the CEO of Old Mutual Asset Managers. He has previously chaired the boards of diverse companies, including Alexander Forbes, Sibanye-Stillwater and General Reinsurance Africa. Sello also serves on the boards of M&G Investments and DG Capital. He is the former deputy CEO of Capital Alliance Asset Managers. 

Sello is a Trustee of the University of Cape Town Foundation. He previously served as the president of the national  Association of Black Securities and Investment Professionals (ABSIP).

See also
 Arrie Rautenbach

References

External links
 Personal Profile at LinkedIn.com

1965 births
Living people
Absa people
South African bankers
South African investment bankers
South African businesspeople
Alumni of the University of Leicester
Wharton School of the University of Pennsylvania alumni